Houck may refer to:

Places
Communities
Houck, Arizona, a census-designated place in Apache County, Arizona, United States
Houck, Missouri, an unincorporated community, United States
Houck, Torbeck, Haiti, village in the Les Cayes arrondissement in the Sud department of Haiti
Oost Houck, a commune in the Nord department in northern France

Landscape
Houck Mountain, in the state of New York, United States

Structures 
Houck Covered Bridge, in Putnam County, Indiana, United States
Houck Farmhouse, historic home located at Guilderland in Albany County, New York, United States
Houck Stadium, multi-purpose stadium in Cape Girardeau, Missouri, United States

People
with this surname
Byron Houck (1891–1969), American pitcher in Major League Baseball during the 1910s
Charles Weston Houck (1933–2017), United States federal judge
Colleen Houck, (born 1969), American writer
Doris Houck (1921–1965), American film actress
Edd Houck (born 1950), American politician
George Francis Houck (1847–1916), Chancellor of the Roman Catholic Diocese of Cleveland
Herbert N. Houck (1915–2002), American Naval flying ace awarded three Navy Crosses during World War II
Hudson Houck (born 1943), American retired professional football coach
Jacob Houck Jr. (1801–1857), American attorney and U.S. Representative from New York
James R. Houck (1940–2015), American astronomer
James W. Houck (born 1958), retired United States Navy vice admiral
John Houck (born 1960), American disc golfer
Joy N. Houck Jr. (1942–2003), American actor, screenwriter and film director
L. Roy Houck (1905–1992), American politician and rancher
Leo Houck (1888–1950), American boxer
Matthew Houck (born 1980), American singer-songwriter
Paul Houck (born 1963), Canadian former ice hockey player
Sadie Houck (1856–1919), American professional baseball player from 1879 to 1888
Tanner Houck (born 1996), American professional baseball player
William Limburg Houck (1893–1960), Canadian politician
William Russell Houck (1926–2016), American Roman Catholic bishop
other
Rebecca Chavez-Houck (born c.1961), Democratic member of the Utah State House of Representatives

See also
Hock (disambiguation)
Houk
Huck (disambiguation)

nl:Houck